Georgii Dmitrievich Karpechenko (1899 in Velsk, Vologda Governorate – July 28, 1941) was a Russian and Soviet biologist. His name has sometimes been transliterated as Karpetschenko.

G. D. Karpechenko specialized in plant cytology and created several hybrids.  Among his contributions is his seminal work on allopolyploids, culminating in his creation of a fertile offspring of radishes and cabbages, the first instance of a new species obtained through polyploid speciation during experimental crossbreeding.

He worked at the Institute of Applied Botany near Leningrad, but collaborated with geneticists in other countries, notably Øjvind Winge in Denmark and Erwin Baur in Germany. He also travelled abroad to the John Innes Horticultural Institution in London. He was arrested by the NKVD under the false grounds of belonging to an alleged "anti-Soviet group" centered on the well known Russian botanist Nikolai Vavilov who was his colleague at Leningrad.  He was sentenced to death and executed on July 28, 1941.

See also 
 List of Russian inventors

Notes

References
Birstein, Vadim J.  The Perversion of Knowledge: The True Story of Soviet Science.  Boulder, Colorado: Westview Press, 2001.
Bentley Glass, The Grim Heritage of Lysenkoism, The Quarterly Review of Biology, Vol. 65, No. 4 (December, 1990), pp. 413–421, refers to "Karpechenko's defense of genetics when it was first assailed by Lysenko",
Karpechenko, G.D., Polyploid hybrids of Raphanus sativus X Brassica oleracea L., Bulletin of Applied Botany. 17:305-408 (1927).
Karpechenko, G.D., 1928. Polyploid hybrids of Raphanus sativus L. X Brassica oleracea L.'' Zeitschrift für induktive Abstammungs- und Vererbungslehre 48, 1–85.Reprinted in: Jules Janick, ed. 1989. Classic papers in horticultural science. The Blackburn Press. Publisher's listing

1899 births
1941 deaths
People from Velsk
People from Velsky Uyezd
Soviet botanists
Horticulturists
Executed Soviet people from Russia
Russian people executed by the Soviet Union
Executed people from Arkhangelsk Oblast
Soviet inventors
People executed by the Soviet Union by firing squad